Eureka Township is a township in Kingman County, Kansas, USA.  As of the 2000 census, its population was 123.

Geography
Eureka Township covers an area of 36.08 square miles (93.44 square kilometers); of this, 0.24 square miles (0.63 square kilometers) or 0.67 percent is water.

Cities and towns
 Penalosa

Adjacent townships
 Bell Township, Reno County (north)
 Loda Township, Reno County (northeast)
 Hoosier Township (east)
 Ninnescah Township (southeast)
 Union Township (south)
 Rural Township (southwest)
 Dresden Township (west)
 Miami Township, Reno County (northwest)

Major highways
 U.S. Route 54

References
 U.S. Board on Geographic Names (GNIS)
 United States Census Bureau cartographic boundary files

External links
 US-Counties.com
 City-Data.com

Townships in Kingman County, Kansas
Townships in Kansas